Bangladesh Institute of Science and Technology (BIST) is a university-level institution affiliated with the National University, Bangladesh located in Dhaka, Bangladesh.The institute was established in 1999 at Kakrail in Dhaka. The institute is regulated by a governing body consisting of Principal, Head of the Faculty Science and Engineering, Head of the Faculty of Business Studies all within the rules and regulations of National University of Bangladesh.

History 
Bangladesh Institute of Science and Technology (BIST) was established in 1999.

Campus 
BIST is located at 122, New Kakrail Road, Dhaka 1000, Bangladesh.

Programs and courses under National University 
 M.Sc. in Computer Science & Engineering (MCSE)
 Masters of Business Administration (MBA)
 B.Sc. (HONS) in Computer Science and Engineering (CSE)
 B.Sc. (HONS) in Electronics and Communication Engineering (ECE)
 Bachelor of Business Administration (BBA)

Other courses under Bangladesh Technical Education Board 
 Diploma in Computer Technology
 Diploma in Electrical Technology
 Diploma in Electronics Technology
 H.S.C. Business Management (BM)

References 

Educational institutions established in 1999
1999 establishments in Bangladesh
Technological institutes of Bangladesh
Engineering universities and colleges in Bangladesh